= Zoroastrian Empire =

Zoroastrian Empire may refer to empires with Zoroastrianism as the state religion:

- Achaemenid Empire, an empire based in Western Asia in Iran, founded in the 6th century BCE by Cyrus the Great
- Parthian Empire, a major Iranian political and cultural power in ancient Iran, founded in 247 BCE and dissolved in 224 CE
- Sasanian Empire, the last Iranian empire before the rise of Islam, ruled by the Sasanian dynasty from 224 CE to 651 CE
